The 2023 Toppserien will be the 37th season of the highest women's football league in Norway. The season is set to start on 25 March 2023 and end on 12 November 2023, not including play-off matches.

Teams

Åsane were promoted from the 2022 First Division.

League table
The league consists of 10 teams who play each other three times, totalling 27 matches per team.

Results

Relegation play-offs
The ninth placed team will face the second placed team of the First Division in a two-legged play-off to decide who will play in the Toppserien next season.

References

External links
Official website
2023 Toppserien at Soccerway.com

Toppserien seasons
Top level Norwegian women's football league seasons
1
Norway